Heronswood is a heritage-listed house located in Dromana, on the Mornington Peninsula in Victoria, Australia. 
Classified by the National Trust of Australia and open to the public,
the house, completed in the Gothic Revival style, is listed on the Australian Heritage Places Register, and the Victorian Heritage Register.

The house is located at 105 Latrobe Parade, Dromana, directly above the beach where Captain Matthew Flinders landed on 27 April 1802.

The gardens
Hearn employed William Moat to develop spacious lawns and gardens. Rare oriental and occidental trees were planted, many of which survive to this day. A cape chestnut is one of the most impressive trees today that survived from these early plantings.  Moat also developed an orchard and fenced Hearn's property. He planted many pine trees, some of which are still standing.
The garden is listed in the Oxford Companion to Gardens as one of only four entries for the state of Victoria, along with the Melbourne Botanical Gardens, Mawallock and Ripponlea. This book, which is worldwide in scope, is an encyclopedia of the art of garden design from the earliest known gardens to the present.

Justice Henry Bourne Higgins
From Hearn, the property was sold to Alexander Sutherland, another university professor, and then, in 1903, to his friend, H. B. Higgins. Hearn had been Higgins' teacher.
Higgins was a highly influential politician and Federal Attorney General. He wrote the Harvester Judgement, at Heronswood, which formed the basis of the Australian arbitration system.  This ensured Australian workers a fair basic wage.

On 13 January 1929 at Heronswood, Higgins took his regular morning walk to Arthur's Seat. ( When younger he also went for a daily morning swim at Anthony's Nose ).  As was his habit he then read on the porch. In the early evening he collapsed and died.  The Trades Hall in Melbourne flew the Australian flag at half mast.  Higgins was buried in Dromana cemetery, with Anglican rites, under the Celtic cross which he had built to commemorate his son. He was survived by Mary Alice Higgins.

Bushfires

On 5 February 1912, The Argus newspaper reported a bushfire in the vicinity of Arthur's Seat. Several residences in Dromana were destroyed."Last evening, at about half-past 5 o'clock, a bush fire swept a portion of the country between Dromana and Rosebud. It swept away the residences of Mrs. Coburn, Springbank, and the summer residence of Mr. Frank Cornell, despite the efforts of a large number of workers.
Miss Burrell's house was saved after great exertions. The township of Rosebud is safe, and the fire is now burning in the direction of Boneo. Portion of the same fire swept towards Heronswood, the seaside residence of Mr. Justice Higgins. The fate of the residence was for some hours uncertain, but the flames were finally beaten off. Fires are still burning at Arthur's Seat and towards Mount Martha."

References

External links

Heritage-listed buildings in Melbourne
1871 establishments in Australia
Gothic Revival architecture in Australia
Buildings and structures in the Shire of Mornington Peninsula
Houses completed in 1871